Volkan Yılmaz (born 1 September 1987) is a Turkish footballer who plays as a forward for Kartal. He made his Süper Lig debut on 14 April 2013.

References

External links
 
 
 
 
 

1987 births
Living people
People from Bakırköy
Footballers from Istanbul
Turkish footballers
Turkey youth international footballers
Elazığspor footballers
Süper Lig players
Association football forwards